Slavo Polugic (born April 2, 1983) is a Swiss heavyweight kickboxer of Serbian and Croatian descent. He is known for his knee strikes, hence the nickname of "The Iron Knee". He has an excellent physical condition and a variable fighting style.

Titles
 2011 WFC World Fighters Council Champion +95 kg 
 2010 WKN Oriental Rules Super Heavyweight World Champion +96,600 kg 
 2009 WKN Oriental Rules Super Heavyweight European Champion +96,600 kg 
 2008 WKN Oriental Rules Super Heavyweight European Champion +96,600 kg 
 2008, 2007, 2006 Swiss Champion 
 2005 WFC B Klasse Swiss Champion

Kickboxing record

|-  bgcolor="#CCFFCC"
| 2013-11-09 || Win ||align=left| Nikos Tsoukalas || WFC Fight Night || Switzerland || TKO (Throwing in the towel) || 3 || 
|-  bgcolor="#CCFFCC"
| 2013-10-12 || Win ||align=left| George Colin || Fight Night Volketswil || Volketswil, Switzerland || Decision (Split)|| 3 || 3:00
|-  bgcolor="#c5d2ea"
| 2012-09-08 || NC ||align=left| Senad Hadžić || 5.Merseburger Fight Night, Semi Finals || Merseburg, Germany || DQ (Both fighters disqualified) || 1 || 
|-  bgcolor="#CCFFCC"
| 2012-09-08 || Win ||align=left| Utley Meriana || 5.Merseburger Fight Night, Quarter Finals || Merseburg, Germany || Decision (Unanimous)|| 3 || 3:00
|-  bgcolor="#CCFFCC"
| 2012-05-05 || Win ||align=left| Murat Gezerci || Eggesin K–1 Fight Cup || Eggesin, Germany || KO || 2 || 
|-  bgcolor="#FFBBBB"
| 2012-04-21 || Loss ||align=left| Nicolaj Falin || Ready 4 War 2 || Zürich, Switzerland || Decision || 3 ||
|-  bgcolor="#FFBBBB"
| 2011-11-17 || Loss ||align=left| Corneliu Rus || SuperKombat: Fight Club || Oradea, Romania ||  TKO (Referee Stoppage)  || 2 || 
|-  bgcolor="#FFBBBB"
| 2011-09-24 || Loss ||align=left| Luca Panto || Best of Leone III || Saint Gallen, Switzerland || Decision || 5 || 3:00
|-  bgcolor="#CCFFCC"
| 2011-09-03 || Win ||align=left| Vladimir Toktasynov || Prestige Fight Club || Baden, Switzerland || KO || 1 || 
|-  bgcolor="#CCFFCC"
| 2011-06-04 || Win ||align=left| Senad Hadžić || Winterthurer Fight Night || Winterthur, Switzerland || KO (Knee) || 1 || 
|-
! style=background:white colspan=9 |
|-
|-  bgcolor="#CCFFCC"
| 2011-05-28 || Win ||align=left| Gökhan Gülücü || Ergen Ring Ateşi || Istanbul, Turkey || Decision || ||3:00
|-  bgcolor="#CCFFCC"
| 2011-04-02 || Win ||align=left| Simon Fiess || Fightnight Volketswil || Zürich, Switzerland || Decision || 5 || 3:00
|-
! style=background:white colspan=9 |
|-
|-  bgcolor="#CCFFCC"
| 2011-03-26 || Win ||align=left| Hamza Kendircioglu || Ergen Ring Ateşi || Istanbul, Turkey || KO || 2 ||
|-  bgcolor="#CCFFCC"
| 2010-08-14 || Win ||align=left| Erhan Deniz || Ergen Ring Ateşi -13 || Van, Turkey || Decision || 5 || 
|-
! style=background:white colspan=9 |
|-
|-  bgcolor="#CCFFCC"
| 2010-06-26 || Win ||align=left| Frank Muñoz || Best of Leone II || Bern, Switzerland || Decision || || 3:00
|-  bgcolor="#FFBBBB"
| 2010-03-19 || Loss ||align=left| Igor Bugaenko || K-1 World Max 2010 - East European Tournament || Minsk, Belarus || Decision (Unanimous) || 3 || 
|-  bgcolor="#CCFFCC"
| 2009-12-26 || Win ||align=left| Hamza Kendircioglu || Ergen Ring Ateşi -11 || Erzurum, Turkey || KO || 1 ||
|-
! style=background:white colspan=9 |
|-
|-  bgcolor="#FFBBBB"
| 2009-10-31 || Loss ||align=left| Hamza Kendircioglu || Ergen Ring Ateşi || Istanbul, Turkey || Decision (unanimous) || 5 ||3:00
|-
! style=background:white colspan=9 |
|-
|-  bgcolor="#CCFFCC"
| 2009-02-21 || Win ||align=left| Goran Vidakovic || Fightnight of the Stars 2 || Bad Ragaz, Switzerland || Decision || 3 || 
|-  bgcolor="#CCFFCC"
| 2008-12-26 || Win ||align=left| Erhan Deniz || Ergen Ring Ateşi || Istanbul, Turkey || KO || 3 ||
|-
! style=background:white colspan=9 |
|-
|-  bgcolor="#CCFFCC"
| 2008-09-08 || Win ||align=left| Patrick Schmied || Fightnight of the Stars || Bad Ragaz, Switzerland || KO || 2 || 
|-  bgcolor="#CCFFCC"
| 2008-05-31 || Win ||align=left| Yussuf Belmikdan || Best of Leone || Saint Gallen, Switzerland || KO || 4 || 
|-  bgcolor="#FFBBBB"
| 2007-12-24 || Loss ||align=left| Ginty Vrede || Return of the King 2 || Paramaribo, Suriname || KO || 2 ||
|-  bgcolor="#CCFFCC"
| 2007-02-24 || Win ||align=left| Oliver Van Damme || Fightnight Vaduz || Vaduz, Liechtenstein || KO || 3 || 
|-  bgcolor="#FFBBBB"
| 2006-12-22 || Loss ||align=left| Tomáš Hron || WKN Kickboxing in Prague || Prague, Czech Republic || TKO || 1 || 
|-
! style=background:white colspan=9 |
|-
|-
| colspan=9 | Legend:

See also 
List of male kickboxers

References

External links
Profile at Sportnote
Wing Thai Gym official site
Mike's Gym official site
Slavo Polugic official site
Leone Sport official site

1983 births
Living people
Swiss male kickboxers
Swiss Muay Thai practitioners
Heavyweight kickboxers
Swiss people of Serbian descent
Swiss expatriates in the Netherlands
SUPERKOMBAT kickboxers